Keyham is an English village in Leicestershire. The population at the 2001 census was 118, which rose to 124 at the 2011 census.

Heritage

Mention of Keyham can be found as early as the 11th century.

The Anglican Parish Church of All Saints is a Grade II* listed building. Its nave and chancel were probably built in the 13th and 14th centuries and the tower added in the 15th. The church was restored in the 19th century. The tower has a fleuron frieze below its battlements.

Keyham Old Hall is one of eleven Grade II listed buildings in the village. It was built in red brick with stone dressings and dates from the late 16th to 17th centuries, but it was much altered and enlarged in the 19th century.

Keyham had a board school from 1885 until 1939 with a single teacher. A history of the school by Michael Freeman is available online.

Social amenities
The village includes a village hall and a public house, the Dog and Gun. There is a camp and caravan site at Long Meadow Farm, and a kennels and cattery in Snows Lane.

The Anglican All Saints' Church forms part of a group benefice with Hungarton, Billesdon, Goadby and Skeffington. A service is held there about once a month.

The village has no public transport. The nearest railway station is at Leicester (4½ miles, 7 km).

References

External links

Keyham Parish Walks

Villages in Leicestershire
Civil parishes in Harborough District